Hazel Path is a historic mansion in Hendersonville, Tennessee, U.S..

The house was built in 1857 for Daniel Smith Donelson, a nephew of U.S. President Andrew Jackson and son-in-law of U.S. Navy Secretary John Branch. Donelson previously lived at the Daniel Smith Donelson House. During the American Civil War of 1861–1865, he served as a major general in the Confederate States Army.

The house was designed in the Greek Revival architectural style. It has been listed on the National Register of Historic Places since April 5, 1984.

References

Houses on the National Register of Historic Places in Tennessee
National Register of Historic Places in Sumner County, Tennessee
Greek Revival architecture in Tennessee
Houses completed in 1857
1857 establishments in Tennessee
Andrew Jackson family